The Ramblin' Galoot is a 1926 American silent Western film. Directed by Fred Bain at the Poverty Row studios of Action Pictures, the film stars Buddy Roosevelt, Violet La Plante, and Frederick Lee. It was released on November 21, 1926.

Cast list
 Buddy Roosevelt as Buddy Royle
 Violet La Plante as Pansy Price
 Frederick Lee as Roger Farnley
 Al Taylor 
 Slim Whitaker (credited as Charles Whitaker)
 Nelson McDowell
 Charles McClary
 Harry Delmour
 Hank Bell

References

External links
 
 

1926 films
1926 Western (genre) films
American black-and-white films
Associated Exhibitors films
Silent American Western (genre) films
1920s American films